Harold Hidmore Purcell (February 7, 1920 – July 14, 2007) was an American lawyer and politician who served in the Virginia House of Delegates and Virginia Senate. He was first elected to the state senate in a special election following Benjamin T. Pitts' resignation due to ill health.

References

External links 

1920 births
2007 deaths
Democratic Party members of the Virginia House of Delegates
20th-century American politicians